Moussa Soumaré (born 6 September 1997) is a French professional footballer who plays as a right-back.

Born in France, Soumaré is of Malian descent. He played for the youth team of Red Star, before representing Nuorese, Virtus Bergamo, Chiasso, LB Châteauroux,  and Saluzzo as a senior.

References

External links
 
 Berichonne Profile

Living people
1997 births
Footballers from Paris
French footballers
French people of Malian descent
Association football fullbacks
Nuorese Calcio players
Virtus Bergamo Alzano Seriate 1909 players
FC Chiasso players
LB Châteauroux players
A.C.S.D. Saluzzo players
Serie D players
Swiss Challenge League players
Ligue 2 players
Championnat National 3 players
French expatriate footballers
French expatriate sportspeople in Italy
French expatriate sportspeople in Switzerland
Expatriate footballers in Italy
Expatriate footballers in Switzerland